New Jersey's 15th congressional district in the House of Representatives was a relatively short-lived district that was created after the 1960 Census and eliminated as a result of the redistricting cycle after the 1980 Census.

New Jersey had gained a fourteenth seat following the 1930 Census, and reached its historic maximum of fifteen in 1963. After the elimination of the 15th, New Jersey was left with 14 seats in the House of Representatives until 1993, when it was reduced to 13 as a result of the 1990 Census.

In 1970, the district's borders largely overlapped those of Middlesex County, and a large majority of the county was in the 15th district.

The district was created starting with the 88th United States Congress in 1963, based on redistricting following the United States Census, 1960. It was eliminated in 1983 following the 97th United States Congress.

List of representatives

References

 Congressional Biographical Directory of the United States 1774–present

15
Former congressional districts of the United States
Constituencies established in 1963
1963 establishments in New Jersey
Constituencies disestablished in 1983
1983 disestablishments in New Jersey